El testament d'Amèlia is a popular Catalan folk song.  It tells the story of a young lady in her deathbed who knowingly drank the poisoned drink given to her by her stepmother, whom she knows has been sleeping with her husband.

It is commonly known as the first part of Miguel Llobet's Canciones Populares Catalanas. Llobet's D minor arrangement has become the accepted classic version for this piece.  It has been recorded by Llobet, Andrés Segovia, John Williams, Julian Bream, Pepe Romero, David Russell, Guy Bacon, Chet Atkins, Stefano Grondona and many others.

Spanish folk music